Harrisia divaricata is a species of cactus endemic to Hispaniola.

References

divaricata
Flora of Haiti
Flora of the Dominican Republic
Flora without expected TNC conservation status